Espot is a municipality in the comarca of the Pallars Sobirà in Catalonia, Spain. It is located in the Espot Valley, east of the river Noguera Pallaresa. The municipality is one of the entrances to the Aigüestortes i Estany de Sant Maurici National Park. Espot has been mentioned in documents dating back to the year 839.

Economy
The economy of the municipality is largely based on tourism, thanks to the ski resort Espot Esquí and an increase in rural tourism. The area also depends on the milk industry and cattle ranching, specifically bovines. There are various hydroelectric power stations in the area including Sant Maurici, Lladres and Espot.

Population history

References

Espot"  from the Enciclopèdia Catalana
Tomàs Bonell, Jordi; Descobrir Catalunya, poble a poble, Prensa Catalana, Barcelona, 1994

External links

Espot City Council 
 Government data pages 
Information and images of Espot 

Municipalities in Pallars Sobirà
Populated places in Pallars Sobirà